Paola Mosca Barberis (born 12 August 1977) is a retired Italian alpine skier.

She competed at the 1995 Junior World Championships, a 14th place her best result.

She competed on the FIS Alpine Ski World Cup circuit in the 1996–97 and 1998–99 seasons, collecting her first World Cup points in December 1998 in Veysonnaz when finishing 29th in the downhill event.

References 

1977 births
Living people
People from Biella
Italian female alpine skiers
Sportspeople from the Province of Biella